"Doja" is a song by American rappers Snot and ASAP Rocky. It was released on February 4, 2022 as the second single from Snot's third studio album Ethereal (2022) and was produced by Dee B. The song caused some controversy over misheard lyrics regarding singer and rapper Doja Cat.

Music video
The official music video was shot in December 2021, and released alongside the single. Directed by Hidji, it finds Snot and ASAP Rocky with their friends in various places in New York City, including a nail salon, tattoo shop and park, and stampeding through an underground subway tunnel. The video ends with a tribute to fashion designer Virgil Abloh, as Rocky looks at a mural of him painted on a brick apartment building.

Controversy
In the chorus of the song, Snot raps, "I'll fuck that bitch named Doja Cat". Many mistook the line as "I fucked that bitch named Doja Cat", including Doja Cat herself, who responded in a Tweet, "you fucked who?", which she then deleted. Snot cleared up the misunderstanding on Twitter, revealing the actual lyrics and adding, "Im talkin my recklessness with no cognizance. It’s no disrespect to Doja. she a queen fr. I made this song to get lit in a moshpit typeshit".

Charts

References

2022 singles
2022 songs
Snot (rapper) songs
ASAP Rocky songs
300 Entertainment singles
Songs written by ASAP Rocky
Cultural depictions of American women